Caloptilia tirantella is a moth of the family Gracillariidae. It is known from the Seychelles.

References

tirantella
Fauna of Seychelles
Moths of Africa
Moths described in 1965